Pelagodes furvifimbria is a moth of the family Geometridae first described by Prout in 1917. It is found in Sri Lanka.

References

Moths of Asia
Moths described in 1917